Eleanor Ross may refer to:

Eleanor L. Ross (born 1967), Judge on the United States District Court for the Northern District of Georgia
Eleanor Ross Taylor (1920–2011), American poet

See also
Elinor Ross (1926–2020), American opera singer